The Roman Catholic Diocese of Fenyang is a diocese located in the city of Fenyang (Shanxi) in the Ecclesiastical province of Taiyuan in China.

History
 May 12, 1926: Established as Apostolic Vicariate of Fenyang 汾陽 from the Apostolic Vicariate of Taiyuanfu 太原府)
 April 11, 1946: Promoted as Diocese of Fenyang 汾陽

Leadership
 Vicars Apostolic of Fenyang 汾陽 (Roman Rite)
 Bishop Aloysius Chen Guodi (Tchen Chao-t’ien), O.F.M. (陳國砥) (May 10, 1926 – March 9, 1930)
 Bishop Francis Liu Jin-wen (Liu Chiu-wen) (劉錦文) (July 23, 1930 – April 11, 1946)
 Bishops of Fenyang 汾陽 (Roman rite)
 Bishop Francis Liu Jin-wen (Liu Chiu-wen) (劉錦文) (April 11, 1946 – January 15, 1948)
 Bishop Simon Lei Chang-hsia (雷震霞) (June 9, 1949 – 1963)
 Bishop John Huo Cheng (1991 – January 2, 2023)

References

 GCatholic.org
 Catholic Hierarchy

Roman Catholic dioceses in China
Christian organizations established in 1926
Roman Catholic dioceses and prelatures established in the 20th century
Religion in Shanxi